C. or  c. may refer to:
 Century, sometimes abbreviated as c. or C., a period of 100 years
 Cent (currency), abbreviated c. or ¢, a monetary unit that equals  of the basic unit of many currencies 
 Caius or Gaius, abbreviated as C., a common Latin praenomen
Circa, abbreviated as c. (or ca., circ., cca, and cc.) a Latin word meaning "about" or "around"
 Abbreviation c. meaning "chapter" in legal citation
 Prefix c/c. (and cc/cc.) meaning "column(s)" as in-source-locator in old citations (example: "c130")

See also 
 C (disambiguation)
 
 C, third letter of the English and Latin alphabets
 Samuel Taylor Coleridge (1772 – 1834), who sometimes used pen-name C., an English poet and philosopher